Puakea Nogelmeier is a kumu hula, linguist, scholar, researcher, writer and Hawaiian composer who is Professor Emeritus of Hawaiian Language at the University of Hawaiʻi at Mānoa and Executive Director of Awaiaulu. Nogelmeier was Professor at the Kawaihuelani Center for Hawaiian Language at the University of Hawai‘i at Mānoa. His translation of The Epic Tale of Hiiakaikapoliopele won the 2008 Samuel M. Kamakau Award for books of the year.

Nogelmeier was born Marvin Nogelmeier. He was given the Hawaiian name, Puakea, by kumu hula Maiki Aiu Lake. "Puakea" translates to "fair child." Nogelmeier was trained in hula by Mililani Allen, learned Hawaiian chant from Edith Kanakaʻole and Edith Kawelohea McKinzie. He learned much of the Hawaiian language and culture from Theodore Kelsey, Sarah Nākoa, and Kamuela Kumukahi.

In 1999, Honolulu's public bus transportation service, TheBus, hired Nogelmeier to rerecord the voice announcements featured on the bus. More than 5,000 individual phrases and place names were recorded for the program. In the process, Nogelmeier researched each Hawaiian place name to ensure the most accurate pronunciation. The recordings have helped to standardize how people pronounce Hawaiian place names.

Life

University (1984-2018)
In 1984, Nogelmeier began teaching Hawaiian language at the University of Hawaii at Mānoa.

Puakea Nogelmeier retired from the University of Hawaii at Mānoa after teaching for 35 years.

Academic Achievements, Awards, and Honors

Samuel M. Kamakau Award - Book of the Year (2008)
Hawaiian Music Hall of Fame (2014)

Nā Hōkū Hanohano Awards
Over the years, Nogelmeier has been nominated for more than two dozen Nā Hōkū Hanohano Awards for a number of categories. He was awarded the Lifetime Achievement Award in 2021 at the 43rd Nā Hōkū Hanohano Awards.

Selected Compositions

Hawaiian
 E O Mai (Performed by Kealiʻi Reichel)
 Ka Hula Papa Holoi (Performed by Nāpua Greig) 
 Ka Nohona Pili Kai (Performed by Kealiʻi Reichel)
 Kawaipunahele (Performed by Kealiʻi Reichel)
 Lei Haliʻa (Performed by Kealiʻi Reichel)
 Nematoda (Performed by Kealiʻi Reichel)
 Toad Song (Performed by Kealiʻi Reichel)
 Pili O Ke Ao (Performed by Kūpaoa) 

Hawaiian-English
 Bumbye (Performed by Kūpaoa)

English
 No Place Like Home (Performed by Mānoa DNA) 
 One Foot on Sand (Performed by Justin Young)

Selected Bibliography

Linguistics
 The Epic Tale of Hiʻiakaikapoliopele 
 I Ulu I Ke Kumu : The Hawai'inuiākea Monograph 
 Ke Kumu Aupuni : The Foundation of Hawaiian Nationhood

Hawaiian Culture
 Ke Aupuni Mōʻī Edited by Puakea Nogelmeier
 ''Keaomelemele ; "He Moʻolelo Kaʻao No Keaomelemele"

References

External links

1953 births
Living people
American male dancers
American male singers
Songwriters from Hawaii
Native Hawaiian musicians
Singers from Hawaii
Na Hoku Hanohano Award winners
American male songwriters